The Friedrichsmoorer Karpfenteiche are ponds in the west of Mecklenburg-Vorpommern, Germany. At an elevation of 35.5–36.9 m, its surface area is 3.3 km².

Lakes of Mecklenburg-Western Pomerania
Ponds of Mecklenburg-Western Pomerania